Ébano is a town and municipality in San Luis Potosí in central Mexico. It is located in the eastern corner of the state, on the border with Veracruz, in the Huasteca region. Its name comes from the Spanish word for ebony. 

The area was the birthplace, on May 14, 1901, of the petroleum industry in Mexico, with the first strike made by a company owned by Edward L. Doheny, assisted by geologist Ezequiel Ordóñez of the Mexican Central Railway.
In 1914, during the Mexican Revolution, the Battle of Ébano took place in the town.

References

Municipalities of San Luis Potosí